Woodsboro High School is a public high school located in Woodsboro, Texas (USA) and classified as a 2A school by the UIL. It is part of the Woodsboro Independent School District located in southwestern Refugio County. In 2015, the school was rated "Met Standard" by the Texas Education Agency.

Athletics
The Woodsboro Eagles compete in these sports - 

Baseball
Basketball
Cross Country
Football
Golf
Softball
Tennis
Track and Field
Volleyball

State Titles
Boys Track - 
1982(2A), 1983(2A),

References

External links
 

Public high schools in Texas
Public middle schools in Texas